Beverly Lane is 2010 comedy horror written and directed by Joshua Hull. It stars Jim O'Rear, Noah East, Raymond Kester, Donald A. Becker, James Copeland, and Mark A. Nash. East plays an office worker who must defend himself against zombies, unhelpful co-workers, and annoying party entertainers.

Plot 
On his first day at a new job at a local metal company, Andy attends the boring retirement party of a manager. The party includes clowns, mimes, and magicians, all of whom are eccentric and annoy the office workers, who are soon put into an even worse situation when zombies attack the building.

Cast 
 Jim O'Rear as Adam Cadabra
 Noah East as Andy
 Raymond Kester as Terry
 Donald A. Becker as Steve
 James Copeland as Ronnie
 Mark A. Nash as Scotty
 Martin Stapleton as Bübbles The English Clown

Production 
Beverly Lane was financed entirely by director Joshua Hull and producer/co-star Jim Dougherty. The film was shot in four days, and they needed to shoot 20 pages a day in order to stay on schedule. Jim O'Rear heard about the film and joined about a month prior to filming.  The film was originally envisioned as a web series, but they decided that the story was better suited to a feature film.  The first day of filming was March 13, 2010, and it included use of local Indiana locations, such as a scrap yard.

Release 
On October 29, 2010, Beverly Lane premiered in Noblesville, Indiana. It included a costume contest and prizes.  It was released on DVD October 25, 2011.  It also played at Gen Con in 2011.

Reception 
Mark L. Miller of Ain't It Cool News wrote, "I must admit some of the deliveries are amateurish, but as I said above this film has a fun spirit, keeps things darkly humorous throughout, and is actually a lot of fun to watch as long as you aren't expecting an Oscar-winning film."

Awards 
Beverly Lane won Best Horror Film at the GIF Festival and five Golden Cob awards, including Best Emerging Filmmaker for Hull.

References

External links 
 
 

2010 films
American comedy horror films
American independent films
American zombie comedy films
2010 comedy horror films
Direct-to-video horror films
Films shot in Indiana
Films set in Indiana
2010 independent films
2010s English-language films
2010s American films
English-language comedy horror films